University of Denver Arena was a 5,200-seat multi-purpose arena in the western United States, in Denver, Colorado. It was home to the University of Denver Pioneers ice hockey team, and also hosted several Frozen Fours.  It was razed in 1997 to make room for the $75 million Magness Arena, part of the Ritchie Center for Sports and Wellness, which opened in 1999.

The structure was originally a U.S. Navy drill hall in northern Idaho, built in the early 1940s at Farragut Naval Training Station at Lake Pend Oreille. It was donated after World War II and reassembled on the DU campus in 1948–49 to house the new ice hockey program and served for nearly half a century.

The arena was refurbished in 1972–73 when the roof needed repairs, and 14 seven-ton steel trusses were added to shore up the roof. Additional patchwork renovations were added in the 1990s, prior to razing the building in 1997. The best known features of the arena were the steep bleacher balcony at the south end, and the 1970s rainbow painted on the north end wall. Famous hockey games held there include the NCAA ice hockey finals in 1961, 1964, and 1976.

References

Denver Pioneers
Denver Pioneers ice hockey
Sports venues in Denver
Demolished sports venues in Colorado
Defunct indoor ice hockey venues in the United States
Defunct college ice hockey venues in the United States
Defunct indoor arenas in the United States
Defunct sports venues in Colorado
Sports venues completed in 1949
1949 establishments in Colorado
1997 disestablishments in Colorado
Sports venues demolished in 1997
Indoor arenas in Colorado